British Nationality Act is a stock short title used for legislation in the United Kingdom relating to nationality.

The Bill for an Act with this short title will have been known as a British Nationality Bill during its passage through Parliament.

List
The British Nationality and Status of Aliens Act 1914
The British Nationality Act 1948
The British Nationality Act 1958
The British Nationality Act 1964 
The British Nationality (No 2) Act 1964 
The British Nationality Act 1965
The British Nationality Act 1981
The British Nationality (Falkland Islands) Act 1983 (c. 6)
The British Nationality (Hong Kong) Act 1990 (c. 34)
The British Nationality (Hong Kong) Act 1997 (c. 20)

The British Subjects Acts 1708 to 1772 was the collective title of the following Acts:
The Foreign Protestants Naturalization Act 1708 (7 Anne c 5)
The British Nationality Act 1730 (4 Geo 2 c 21)
The British Subjects Act 1751 (25 Geo 2 c 39)
The British Nationality Act 1772 (13 Geo 3 c 21)

See also
History of British nationality law
Immigration, Asylum and Nationality Act 2006
List of short titles

References

Lists of legislation by short title
British nationality law